Light It Up is a 2008 album by American rock band Rev Theory (formerly known as Revelation Theory). It is their sophomore major label album and first under the Interscope Records label, and was released on June 10, 2008 to sales of 10,200 copies. It reached number 74 on the Billboard 200 on June 28, 2008 and has sold 132,000 copies to date.

Track listing
All tracks written by Rev Theory.

"Hell Yeah" – 4:07
"Favorite Disease" – 3:41
"Light It Up" – 4:13
"Broken Bones" – 4:26
"Kill the Headlights" – 3:15
"Wanted Man" – 3:41
"Ten Years" – 3:43
"Falling Down" – 4:05
"You're the One" – 4:20
"Far from Over" – 3:59
Wal-Mart edition bonus track (digital download)
"Light It Up (Acoustic)" – 4:13

Singles
 "Light It Up" (March 2008)
 "Hell Yeah" (March 2008)
 "Far from Over" (March 2009)
 "Broken Bones" (January 2010)

Reception

Light It Up received relatively positive reviews. Critics have agreed that the album contains many catchy riffs and solid rock n' roll harmonies. The album has sold about 100,000 copies as of 2009.

References

External links
 Official Rev Theory website

2008 albums
Rev Theory albums
Interscope Records albums
Albums produced by Josh Abraham